Taken from Me: The Tiffany Rubin Story is a 2011 original LMN film, starring Taraji P. Henson and Terry O'Quinn. The film follows the events surrounding the kidnapping, captivity and rescue of the son of Tiffany Rubin, who was kidnapped by his father and taken to South Korea.

Plot

The film is based on the dramatic true story of Tiffany Rubin's daring 2008 rescue of her six-year-old son, Kobe, after he was abducted by his biological father Jeff and taken from his home in Queens, New York, all the way to Seoul, South Korea. At the urging of her mother Belzora, Tiffany seeks the counsel of Mark Miller (Terry O'Quinn) and his charitable organization, the American Association for Lost Children. With Mark's help, Tiffany is able to travel to Korea to execute a high-stakes plan to bring her son home.

Cast
Taraji P. Henson as Tiffany 
Terry O'Quinn as Mark 
David Haydn-Jones as Chris 
Crystal Lowe as Natalie
Sean Baek as Jeff
Beverly Todd as Belzora

Awards

Taken from Me: The Tiffany Rubin Story received several award nominations and accolades, mostly for Taraji P. Henson's performance. Henson received five nominations to various awards, and won three of them.

See also
Parental child abduction

References

External links
 
 
 Tiffany Rubin’s story - how she took her son back from S. Korea

Films about child abduction
Lifetime (TV network) films
African-American biographical dramas
Canadian television films
Canadian films based on actual events
English-language Canadian films
2011 television films
2011 films
2010s Canadian films
2010s American films